Brunswick was launched on the River Thames in 1791 as a West Indiaman. She captured one prize. After the end of the Napoleonic Wars, she made two voyages carrying almost 600 migrants from Ireland to Canada, She spent most of her career trading between Britain and Quebec, though she also traded with other destinations. She was condemned at Valparaiso in 1849.

Career
Brunswick first appeared in Lloyd's Register (LR) with J. Douglas, master, T.Hibbert & Co., owner, and trade London–Jamaica.

After the outbreak of war with France Captain John Graham Douglas acquired a letter of marque on 10 October 1793. The size of the crew previewed on the letter of marque suggested that the initial plan was that Brunswick would cruise as a privateer. There is no sign that she ever did so. Instead, she apparently sailed as a West Indiaman.

On 4 April 1805 Brunswick, Shaw, master, arrived at Jamaica "with their prize".

Brunswick then disappeared from the registers until 1810–1811.

On 5 June 1812 Captain John Otto Richard Clearly acquired a letter of marque. However, he does not appear as master in either LR or the Register of Shipping.

In June 1818 Richard Talbot left Cork with 230 settlers for Canada. Brunswick, Blake, master, arrived at Quebec on 29 July.

In 1825 Brunswick, Robert Blake, master, carried 343 assisted immigrants from Cork to Quebec under a scheme organized by Peter Robinson. Brunswick left Cork on 11 May and arrived at Quebec on 12 June.

Fate
Brunswick was last listed in 1850. LR showed her with T.Poulton, master, Tebbuts & Co., owners, and trade London–Valparaiso. She had undergone small repairs in 1849.

Brunswick, Poulton, master, had sailed to the Chincha Islands to gather guano. She sailed from there for the United States when she became leaky. She put back into Valparaiso on 16 September 1849 and was condemned there.

Notes

Citations

1791 ships
Age of Sail merchant ships of England
Migrant ships to Canada